Akhowr Khash (also Romanized as Ākhowr Khash, Ākhvorrash, and Akhor Vakhsh; also known as Ākhowr and Al Khawr) is a village in Jelogir Rural District, in the Central District of Pol-e Dokhtar County, Lorestan Province, Iran. At the 2006 census, its population was 35, in 7 families.

References 

Towns and villages in Pol-e Dokhtar County